Tréogat is a commune in the Finistère department of Brittany in north-western France.

Population 
Inhabitants of Tréogat are called Tréogatais in French.

See also 
 Communes of the Finistère department

References

External links 

 
 Mayors of Finistère Association 

Communes of Finistère